Manitowoc County  is a county in the U.S. state of Wisconsin. As of the 2020 census, the population was 81,359. Its county seat is Manitowoc. The county was created in 1836 prior to Wisconsin's statehood and organized in 1848. Manitowoc County comprises the Manitowoc, WI Micropolitan Statistical Area.

Geography

Major highways

Railroads
Canadian National

Buses
Maritime Metro Transit
List of intercity bus stops in Wisconsin

Airport
Manitowoc County Airport (KMTW) serves the county and surrounding communities.

Adjacent counties
 Brown County – northwest
 Kewaunee County – northeast
 Sheboygan County – south
 Calumet County – west
 Mason County, MI - east & southeast
 Manistee County, MI - northeast

Climate

Demographics

As of the census of 2020, the population was 81,359. The racial makeup of the county was 88.5% White, 2.8% Asian, 1.3% Black or African American, 0.6% Native American, 1.8% from other races, and 4.9% from two or more races. Ethnically, the population was 5.0% Hispanic or Latino of any race.

The 2000 census shows Manitowoc County as having 82,887 people, 32,721 households and 22,348 families.The population density was 140 people per square mile (54/km2). There were 34,651 housing units at an average density of 59 per square mile (23/km2). The racial makeup of the county was 95.90% White, 0.30% Black or African American, 0.43% Native American, 1.98% Asian, 0.04% Pacific Islander, 0.60% from other races, and 0.76% from two or more races. 1.62% of the population were Hispanic or Latino of any race. 53.7% were of German, 7.3% Polish, 5.3% Czech and 5.0% American ancestry. 95.2% spoke English, 1.8% Spanish, 1.3% Hmong and 1.1% German as their first language.

There were 32,721 households, out of which 31.50% had children under the age of 18 living with them, 57.10% were married couples living together, 7.50% had a female householder with no husband present, and 31.70% were non-families. 26.80% of all households were made up of individuals, and 12.10% had someone living alone who was 65 years of age or older. The average household size was 2.49 and the average family size was 3.04.

In the county, the population is spread out, with 25.5% under the age of 18, 7.60% from 18 to 24, 28.20% from 25 to 44, 23% from 45 to 64, and 15.70% who were 65 years of age or older. The median age was 38 years. For every 100 females there were 98.20 males. For every 100 females age 18 and over, there were 96.10 males.

In 2017, there were 780 births, giving a general fertility rate of 60.2 births per 1000 women aged 15–44, the 27th lowest rate out of all 72 Wisconsin counties. Additionally, there were 43 reported induced abortions performed on women of Manitowoc County residence in 2017.

Government
The county executive is Bob Ziegelbauer. He is serving his fourth term in that position after being elected in April 2006 and reelected in April 2010, April 2014, and April 2018.  The county is served by a 25-member county board.

Politics
Manitowoc County is fairly competitive in presidential elections; in 2016, Donald Trump became the first candidate since Lyndon B. Johnson from 1964 to win more than 55% of the vote. He expanded his share to 60% during the 2020 elections. Statewide, Manitowoc has voted Republican since the 2002 gubernatorial election.

Communities

Cities
 Kiel (partly in Calumet County)
 Manitowoc (county seat)
 Two Rivers

Villages

 Cleveland
 Francis Creek
 Kellnersville
 Maribel
 Mishicot
 Reedsville
 St. Nazianz
 Valders
 Whitelaw

Towns

 Cato
 Centerville
 Cooperstown
 Eaton
 Franklin
 Gibson
 Kossuth
 Liberty
 Manitowoc
 Manitowoc Rapids
 Maple Grove
 Meeme
 Mishicot
 Newton
 Rockland
 Schleswig
 Two Creeks
 Two Rivers

Census-designated places
 Collins

Unincorporated communities

 Alverno
 Branch
 Cato
 Cato Falls
 Clarks Mills
 Clover
 Cooperstown
 Duveneck
 Fisherville
 Grimms
 Hickory Grove
 Kellners Corners
 Kingsbridge
 Larrabee
 Louis Corners
 Madsen
 Maple Grove
 Meeme
 Meggers (partial)
 Melnik
 Menchalville
 Millhome
 Newton
 Newtonburg
 North Grimms
 Northeim
 Osman
 Reifs Mills
 Rockville
 Rockwood
 Rosecrans
 Rube
 School Hill
 Shoto
 Spring Valley
 Steinthal
 Taus
 Tisch Mills (partial)
 Two Creeks
 Wells (partial)
 Zander

At night

In the media
The Netflix documentary series Making a Murderer (2015) explores the arrests and trials in 2007 of Manitowoc County residents Steven Avery and his nephew Brendan Dassey for the murder of Teresa Halbach, who disappeared in October 2005. The series describes an earlier wrongful conviction of Avery, for which he served 18 years, and his subsequent lawsuit against Manitowoc County. It then focuses on the procedures of the Calumet County Sheriff's Office and the Manitowoc County Sheriff's Department, which investigated the later Halbach case. The Sheriffs officers have come under intense scrutiny for their involvement in the Halbach case due to Steven Avery's $36 million lawsuit and their questionable police and investigative techniques.

Gallery

See also
 National Register of Historic Places listings in Manitowoc County, Wisconsin

References

Further reading
 Falge, Louis (ed.). History of Manitowoc County, Wisconsin. Chicago: Goodspeed Historical Association, 1912. Vol. 1, Vol. 2
 Langill, Ellen, Robin E. Butler, Rachel Young, and MaryBeth Matzek. Manitowoc County: A Beacon on the Lakeshore. Milwaukee, Wis.: Milwaukee Pub. Group, 1999.
 Plumb, Ralph Gordon. A History of Manitowoc County. Manitowoc, Wis.: Brant Print & Binding Co., 1904.
 Rapper, Joseph J. Story of a Century, 1848-1948: Manitowoc County During Wisconsin's First Hundred Years. Manitowoc, Wis.: Manitowoc County Centennial Committee, 1948.

External links
 Official website
 Manitowoc County map from the Wisconsin Department of Transportation

 
Wisconsin counties
1836 establishments in Wisconsin Territory
Populated places established in 1836